Harutaeographa rubida is a moth of the family Noctuidae. It is found in Nepal and northern India
(Sikkim).

References

Moths described in 1894
Orthosiini